= 1951–52 Plunket Shield season =

Cricket tournament in New Zealand

1951–52 Plunket Shield
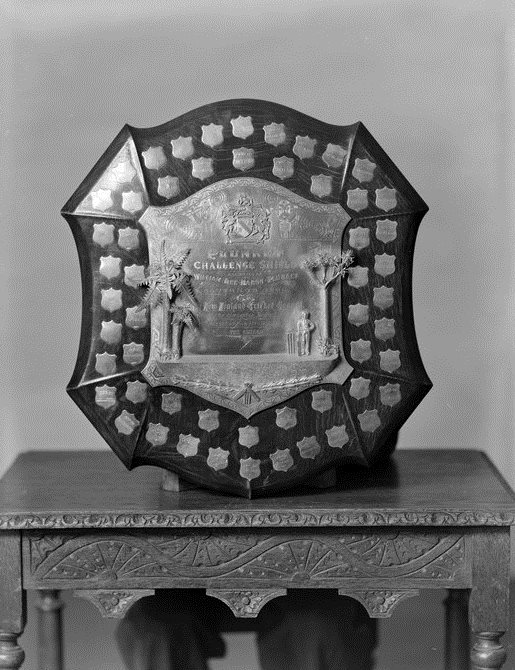
- The Plunket Shield trophy
- Cricket format: First-class
- Tournament format(s): Round-robin
- Champions: Canterbury (6th title)
- Participants: 5
- Matches: 10

The 1951–52 Plunket Shield season was a tournament of the Plunket Shield, the domestic first-class cricket competition of New Zealand.

Canterbury won the championship, finishing at the top of the points table at the end of the round-robin tournament between the five first-class sides, Auckland, Canterbury, Central Districts, Otago and Wellington. Eight points were awarded for a win, four points for having a first innings lead in a draw and two points for a first innings deficit in a draw.

== Table ==
Below are the Plunket Shield standings for the season:

Team	Played	Won	Lost	Drawn	Points	NetRpW
Canterbury	4	3	0	1	26	9.481
Auckland	4	3	1	0	24	12.127
Central Districts	4	2	2	0	16	-10.562
Otago	4	0	2	2	6	-8.393
Wellington	4	0	3	1	4	-1.824
